Job Today (stylized JOB TODAY) is an employment networking app service based in Luxembourg City, Luxembourg. It uses a location-based job search mobile app that facilitates communication between employers and job seekers, allowing users to secure short and long-term employment contracts within 24 hours or less. JOB TODAY has become a leading provider in the field of online recruitment. On the electronic platform, employers and jobseekers can communicate with each other directly via in-app chat, and in-app videocall which on the one hand is more unconventional and is particularly popular with young jobseekers and on the other hand gives employers quick results.
As of September 2021, JOB TODAY has processed over 250 million job applications.

History
JOB TODAY was launched in May 2015 in Barcelona and Madrid. In January 2016, the company announced a $10 million fundraising initiative to expand its operations to London, which attracted the investment of Accel Partners, Felix Capital and Mangrove Capital Partners.
In October 2016, a $35 million fundraising deal brought further investment from Channel 4, RTL Germany, Atresmedia and German Media Pool VC.

Products and services
JOB TODAY provides an online platform through its mobile app and website that enables small businesses and job seekers to create lasting profiles and gives both parties the opportunity to connect to address mutual employment-related needs. Both the mobile app and web offer full-fledged hiring and application capabilities, and offers the ability to sort and chat between parties.

Awards
In December 2016, JOB TODAY was named the winner of the social category in the Startup Europe Awards’ Luxembourg category. In 2017, it was shortlisted for three accolades in the OnRec Awards 2017, including newcomer of the year.

In 2020 JOB TODAY has been awarded by the World Economic Forum among 100 of the most promising Technology Pioneers of 2020, who are shaping industries while also working on sustainability issues. JOB TODAY made it to the selection for its contributions in the field of employment.

See also
 Employment website
 Accel Partners
 Atresmedia
 Channel 4

References

External links
 JOB TODAY website

Service companies of Spain
Companies based in Barcelona
Business services companies established in 2015